American singer Sam Hunt has released two studio albums, one mixtape, three extended plays, ten singles, and ten music videos. Hunt signed a record deal with MCA Nashville and launched his musical career with the release of the single "Raised on It" in 2013; it received moderate chart success, peaking at number 49 on Hot Country Songs. Then came the launch of his debut studio album Montevallo in October 2014. It topped the Top Country Albums chart and peaked at number three on the Billboard 200. It was certified 2× Platinum by the Recording Industry Association of America (RIAA) and reached a million sales in the country by February 2016. The album also peaked at number two on the Canadian Albums Chart and received a Gold certification from Music Canada. Montevallo spawned five singles, including the international hit "Take Your Time", which peaked at number 20 on the Billboard Hot 100 and topped Hot Country Songs; it was later certified 4× Platinum by the RIAA.

Albums

Studio albums

Mixtapes

Extended plays

Singles

As lead artist

As featured artist

Promotional singles

Other charted songs

Music videos

Writing credits

Notes

References

External links 

Sam Hunt profile on AllMusic

Discographies of American artists
Country music discographies